Great Mass in C minor, K. 427/417a, is the common name of the musical setting of the mass by Wolfgang Amadeus Mozart, which is considered one of his greatest works. He composed it in Vienna in 1782 and 1783, after his marriage, when he moved to Vienna from Salzburg. The large-scale work, a missa solemnis, is scored for two soprano soloists, a tenor and a bass, double chorus and large orchestra. It remained unfinished, missing large portions of the Credo and the complete Agnus Dei.

Composition and first performance

The work was composed during 1782–83. In a letter to his father Leopold dated 4 January 1783, Mozart mentioned a vow he had made to write a mass when he would bring his then fiancée Constanze as his wife to Salzburg to meet his family for the first time after his father's earlier opposition. Constanze then sang the "Et incarnatus est" at its premiere.

The first performance took place in Salzburg on Sunday 26 October 1783 (the twentieth Sunday after Pentecost). Mozart had moved to Vienna in 1781, but was paying a visit to his home town in the company of Constanze, who had not yet met his father or his sister (Nannerl).

The performance consisted of just the Kyrie, Gloria, Sanctus and Benedictus, as surviving parts and a score copy from ca. 1800 show. It took place in the Church of St. Peter's Abbey in the context of a Roman Catholic mass. Mozart's sister's diary mentions that the performers were the entire , that is the musicians employed at the court of Salzburg's ruler, Prince-Archbishop Count Hieronymus von Colloredo and thus Mozart's former colleagues. There was a rehearsal in the nearby Kapellhaus on 23 October 1783.

Fragmentary status

The work is incomplete, missing the Credo movements following the aria Et incarnatus est (the orchestration of the only two surviving Credo movements being incomplete) and all of the Agnus Dei. The Sanctus and the Benedictus are partially lost and require editorial reconstructions. There is a good deal of speculation concerning why the work was left unfinished. For purposes of modern performances, the editions and completions available are those by Alois Schmitt (1901, Breitkopf & Härtel), H. C. Robbins Landon (1956, Eulenburg), Helmut Eder (1985, Bärenreiter), Franz Beyer (1989, Amadeus/Edition Peters), Richard Maunder (1990, Oxford University Press/Carus Verlag), Philip Wilby (2004, Novello), Robert Levin (2005, Carus-Verlag), Clemens Kemme (2018, Breitkopf & Härtel), and Ulrich Leisinger (2019, Bärenreiter).

The editions by Landon, Eder, Beyer, Maunder and Kemme aim to simply fill out the missing orchestrations and choral parts in the Credo and Sanctus, whereas the editions by Schmitt, Wilby and Levin aim to complete the work by either using movements from other masses or composing new music for the Credo and Agnus Dei through the use of parody or elaboration of period sketches by Mozart.
Benjamin-Gunnar Cohrs (Musikproduktion Höflich) just offers a complete Credo and an Agnus Dei. For the Credo this means a completions of the 'Credo in unum Deum' and the 'Et incarnatus est' and additional music for the rest of the Credo. This edition, therefore, is intended to be used in combination with any other version of the Mass.
Robert Xavier Rodriguez has also completed the Agnus Dei.

Mozart later reused the music from the Kyrie and Gloria, almost without changes except for the text, in the cantata Davide penitente, K. 469.

Structure

Influence

The work embodies pomp and solemnity associated with the Salzburg traditions of the time, but it also anticipates the symphonic masses of Joseph Haydn in its solo-choral sharing. The mass shows the influence of Bach and Handel, whose music Mozart was studying at this time (see Gottfried van Swieten).

On 20 August 2016 the version reconstructed by Helmut Eder was performed at the Royal Albert Hall, for the first time as part of The Proms series, by the BBC Scottish Symphony Orchestra and BBC Symphony Chorus, with Ilan Volkov conducting and featuring Louise Alder, Carolyn Sampson, Benjamin Hulett and Matthew Rose.

Discography 
Here is a selection or recordings: 
 Ferenc Fricsay, Berlin Radio Symphony Orchestra, Chor der St.-Hedwigs-Kathedrale Berlin, Maria Stader, Hertha Töpper, Ernst Haefliger, Ivan Sardi. Label: Deutsche Grammophon, 1959
 Sir Colin Davis, London Symphony Orchestra, London Symphony Chorus, Helen Donath, Heather Harper, Ryland Davies, Stafford Dean. Label: Philips Classics, February 1971
 Raymond Leppard, New Philharmonia Orchestra, John Alldis Choir, Ileana Cotrubaș, Kiri Te Kanawa, Werner Krenn, Hans Sotin. Label: EMI, 1974
 Herbert von Karajan, Berliner Philharmoniker, Wiener Singverein, Barbara Hendricks, Janet Perry, Peter Schreier, Benjamin Luxon. Label: Deutsche Grammophon, 1981
 John Eliot Gardiner, English Baroque Soloists, Monteverdi Choir, Sylvia McNair, Diana Montague, Anthony Rolfe Johnson, Cornelius Hauptmann. Label: Archiv, November 1986
 Robert Shaw, Atlanta Symphony Orchestra & Chorus, Edith Wiens, Delores Ziegler, John Aler, William Stone. Label: Telarc, 1988
 , Collegium Cartusianum Orchestra, Cologne Chamber Choir, Barbara Schlick, Monika Frimmer, Christoph Prégardien, Klaus Mertens. Label: EMI Electrola, November 19–22, 1989
 Leonard Bernstein, Bavarian Radio Symphony Orchestra and Choir, Arleen Augér, Frederica von Stade, Frank Lopardo, Cornelius Hauptmann. Label: Deutsche Grammophon 431 791–2, 1991
 Version of Richard Maunder: Christopher Hogwood, Academy of Ancient Music, Westminster College Quiristers, Winchester Cathedral Choir, Arleen Augér, Lynne Dawson, John-Mark Ainsley, David Thomas. Label: L'Oiseau-Lyre, 1990
 James Levine, Wiener Philharmoniker, chorus, Kathleen Battle, Martin Haselböck, others. Label: Deutsche Grammophon, 1998
 Masaaki Suzuki, Bach Collegium Japan instrumental and vocal ensembles, Christian Immler, Makoto Sakurada, Carolyn Sampson, . Label: BIS Records, 2016

Videography
 Leonard Bernstein, Bavarian Radio Symphony Orchestra and Chorus, Arleen Auger, Frederica von Stade, Frank Lopardo, Cornelius Hauptmann. Label: Deutsche Grammophon, 2006

References
Notes

Sources

Further reading
 Black, David (2007) "Mozart and the Practice of Sacred Music, 1781–91". PhD diss., Harvard University, 84–126.
Solomon, Maynard (1995) Mozart: A Life. HarperCollins.

External links
 
 
 h2g2 "Mozart's Mass in C Minor"
 Mozart, Great Mass in C minor, preface (German/English) of the completion by Benjamin-Gunnar Cohrs (2010)

1783 compositions
Masses by Wolfgang Amadeus Mozart
Unfinished musical compositions
Musical compositions completed by others
Compositions in C minor